Jay A. Garcia-Gregory (born 1944) is a Senior United States district judge of the United States District Court for the District of Puerto Rico.

Education and career

Born in San Juan, Puerto Rico, Garcia-Gregory received an Artium Baccalaureus degree from Assumption College in 1966, a Master of Arts from the University of Madrid in 1969, and a Bachelor of Laws from the University of Puerto Rico School of Law in 1972. He was a law clerk for Judge Hiram Cancio and Judge Jose Toledo of the  United States District Court for the District of Puerto Rico from 1973 to 1974. He was in private practice in Puerto Rico from 1974 to 2000.

Federal judicial service

On April 5, 2000, Garcia-Gregory was nominated by President Bill Clinton to a seat on the United States District Court for the District of Puerto Rico vacated by Raymond L. Acosta. Garcia-Gregory was confirmed by the United States Senate on June 16, 2000, and received his commission on July 11, 2000. He assumed senior status on September 30, 2018.

See also
List of Hispanic/Latino American jurists

References

Sources

1944 births
Living people
Assumption University (Worcester) alumni
Complutense University of Madrid alumni
Hispanic and Latino American judges
Judges of the United States District Court for the District of Puerto Rico
United States district court judges appointed by Bill Clinton
University of Puerto Rico alumni
People from San Juan, Puerto Rico
20th-century American judges
21st-century American judges
Puerto Rican judges